CAM ships were World War II-era British merchant ships used in convoys as an emergency stop-gap until sufficient escort carriers became available. CAM ship is an acronym for catapult aircraft merchant ship.

They were equipped with a rocket-propelled catapult launching a single Hawker Hurricane, dubbed a "Hurricat" or "Catafighter" to destroy or drive away an attacking bomber. Normally the Hurricane fighter would be lost when the pilot then bailed out or ditched in the ocean near the convoy. CAM ships continued to carry their normal cargoes after conversion.

The concept was developed and tested by the five fighter catapult ships, commissioned as warships and commanded and crewed by the Royal Navy – but the CAM ships were merchant vessels, commanded and crewed by the Merchant Navy.

Origin

The German Luftwaffe had Focke-Wulf Fw 200 Condor aircraft with a range of nearly 2,000 nautical miles (3,700 km – 2,300 miles). After the Fall of France, these aircraft could operate from western France against British merchant ships in the Atlantic. Flying from Bordeaux–Mérignac Airport, Fw 200s of I/KG40 could reach the convoy lanes west of Britain while staying outside the range of British land-based fighters. The Royal Navy had no aircraft carriers available to provide close air cover for the convoys. The Fw 200s could shadow convoys, directing U-boat attacks on them, or drop bombs on convoy ships, without opposition and to deadly effect.

To counter this threat, the Admiralty developed the fighter catapult ship a converted freighter, crewed by naval sailors, carrying a single Hawker Hurricane fighter. When an enemy bomber was sighted, the fighter would be launched into the air with rockets, and fly up to destroy or drive away the bomber. Being large and slow, the Fw 200 became a rather vulnerable target. After the combat, the fighter pilot would bail out or ditch in the ocean near the convoy, and be picked up if all went well.

The Admiralty had already experimented with this system. They ordered 50 rocket-propelled aircraft catapults to be fitted to merchant ships. The planes were Hurricane Mark Is, converted to Sea Hurricane IAs.

The pilots for these aircraft were drawn from the Royal Air Force (RAF). The RAF formed the Merchant Ship Fighter Unit (MSFU) on 5 May 1941 in RAF Speke by the River Mersey in Liverpool.  Wing Commander E.S. Moulton-Barrett commanded the unit providing training for volunteer pilots, fighter direction officers (FDOs), and airmen. After training, MSFU crews were posted to Liverpool, Glasgow, or Avonmouth where they assisted in loading their Hurricanes onto the catapults. Each team consisted of one pilot for Atlantic runs (or two pilots for voyages to Russia, Gibraltar, or the Mediterranean Sea), with one fitter, one rigger, one radio-telephone operator, one FDO, and a seaman torpedoman who worked on the catapult as an electrician.

MSFU crews signed ship's articles as civilian crew members under the authority of the civilian ship's master. The ship's chief engineer became responsible for the catapult, and the first mate acted as catapult duty officer (CDO), responsible for firing the catapult when directed. The single Hurricane fighter was launched only when enemy aircraft were sighted and agreement was reached using hand and flag signals between the pilot, CDO, and ship's master.

The first four or five ships were taken into Royal Navy service as "auxiliary fighter catapult ships", and later conversions were officially named CAMs and crewed by merchant sailors. The first CAM ship, Michael E, was sponsored by the Royal Navy while the RAF MSFUs were working up. After a trial launch off Belfast, Michael E sailed with convoy OB 327 on 28 May 1941. She was sunk by U-108 on 2 June.
The first RAF trial CAM launch was from Empire Rainbow, at Greenock on the River Clyde on 31 May 1941; the Hurricane landed at Abbotsinch. Six CAM ships joined convoys in June 1941. When a CAM ship arrived at its destination, the pilot usually launched and landed at a nearby airfield to get in as much flight time as possible before his return trip. Pilots were rotated out of CAM assignments after two round-trip voyages to avoid the deterioration of flying skills from the lack of flying time during the assignment.

CAM sailings were initially limited to North American convoys with aircraft maintenance performed by the Royal Canadian Air Force at Dartmouth, Nova Scotia. CAM ships sailed on Gibraltar and Freetown convoys beginning in September 1941, after an aircraft maintenance unit was established at the RAF base at North Front, Gibraltar. No CAM aircraft were provided during January and February 1942 after it proved impossible to maintain the catapult-mounted aircraft in flying order during the North Atlantic winter. CAM sailings resumed on 6 March 1942 on North Atlantic convoys and in April on the Arctic Russian convoys with an RAF aircraft maintenance unit in Archangelsk.

CAM ships
Eight CAM ships were requisitioned from private owners, two of which were sunk:

  Daghestan
 Daltonhall
 Eastern City
 Helencrest
 Kafiristan
 Michael E (sunk)
 Novelist
 Primrose Hill (sunk).

27 CAM ships were Ministry of War Transport owned Empire ships, ten of which were sunk:

  Empire Burton (sunk)
 Empire Clive
 Empire Darwin
 
 Empire Dell (sunk)
 Empire Eve (sunk)
 Empire Faith
 Empire Flame
 Empire Foam
 Empire Franklin
 Empire Gale
 Empire Heath
 Empire Hudson (sunk)
 Empire Lawrence (sunk)
 Empire Moon
 Empire Morn
 Empire Ocean
 Empire Rainbow (sunk)
 Empire Ray
 Empire Rowan (sunk)
 Empire Shackleton (sunk)
 Empire Spray
 Empire Spring (sunk)
 Empire Stanley
 Empire Sun
 Empire Tide
 Empire Wave (sunk).

Take-off procedure

 The trolley receiving bar was removed at dawn.
 The airmen started the aircraft and warmed up the engine at intervals.
 The pilot climbed into the aircraft when enemy aircraft were reported.
 The ship hoisted the international flag code F when the decision was made to launch. (CAM ships were usually stationed at the head of the outboard port column of a convoy so they could manoeuvre into the wind for launch.)
 An airman removed the pins, showed them to the pilot, and took them to the Catapult Duty Officer (CDO).
 The pilot applied 30 degree flaps and 1/3 right rudder.
 The CDO raised a blue flag above his head to inform the ship's master of his readiness to launch.
 The ship's master manoeuvred the ship into the wind and raised a blue flag above his head to authorise the launch. (The ship's master stood on the starboard bridge wing to avoid the catapult rocket blast which sometimes damaged the port side of the bridge.)
 The CDO waved his blue flag indicating he was ready to launch upon a signal from the pilot.
 The pilot opened full throttle, tightened the throttle friction nut, pressed his head back into the head-rest, pressed his right elbow tightly against his hip, and lowered his left hand as a signal to launch.
 The CDO counted to three, waited for the bow to rise from the trough of a swell, and moved the switch to fire the catapult rockets.

CAM combat launches

In total, there were nine combat launches. Nine German aircraft were destroyed (four Condors, four Heinkel 111s and a Junkers 88), one damaged and three chased away. Eight Hurricanes were ditched and only one pilot lost.

Programme termination
As adequate numbers of escort carriers became available, CAM sailings on North American and Arctic Russian convoys were discontinued in August 1942. The aircraft maintenance unit was withdrawn from Archangelsk in September 1942. Catapults were removed from 10 of the 26 surviving CAM ships while the remaining 16 continued to sail with the Mediterranean and Freetown convoys.  Headquarters RAF Fighter Command ordered all MSFUs to be disbanded commencing 8 June 1943. The combat launches from homeward bound convoy SL 133 were from the last two operational CAM ships to sail; the last MSFU was disbanded on 7 September 1943. Twelve of the 35 CAM ships had been sunk while sailing on 170 round trip voyages. Two more ships, Cape Clear and City of Johannesburg, were briefly fitted with dummy catapults and aircraft for deception purposes in late 1941.

See also
 Merchant aircraft carrier
 Fighter catapult armed auxiliary ship
 Brodie landing system
 Aviation-capable naval vessel

Notes

References

Bibliography

External links

 Alan Payne, The Catapult Fighters, Australian Naval Historical Society

British Merchant Navy
 
North Atlantic convoys of World War II